Ransom is an unincorporated community located in Pike County, Kentucky, United States. Its post office  closed in 1988.

References

Unincorporated communities in Pike County, Kentucky
Unincorporated communities in Kentucky